The NatWest Women's T20 Quadrangular Series was a women's Twenty20 International series which took place in England in 2011. The top four ranked teams in the world competed: Australia, England, India and New Zealand. The tournament consisted of a round-robin group stage, in which England and Australia finished as the top two, and then a third-place play-off and a final were contested to decide the final positions. England defeated Australia by 16 runs in the final. The tournament was followed by an ODI Quadrangular Series, with the same teams competing.

Squads

Points table
Note: P = Played, W = Wins, L = Losses, Pts = Points, NRR = Net run rate.

 Source:ESPNCricinfo

Matches

Third-place play-off

Final

Players statistics

Most runs

Most wickets

See also
 2011 NatWest Women's Quadrangular Series

References

External links
 Series home at ESPNCricinfo

2011 in English women's cricket
2010–11 Australian women's cricket season
2011 in New Zealand cricket
cricket
2011 in Indian cricket
2011 in women's cricket
International women's cricket competitions in England
International cricket competitions in 2011
Women's Twenty20 cricket international competitions
2010–11 Indian women's cricket
NatWest Group